Andrey Anatolevich Simonov (born 30 July 1971) is a Russian aviation historian. In addition to contributing to Russian Wikipedia on the subject, he has written several books and encyclopedias about Soviet aviation in World War II and the development of the aviation in the USSR. He was one of the few members of the Russian delegation invited to the premiere of the movie Haytarma, a film about twice Hero of the Soviet Union Amet-khan Sultan, who chose to attend.

Books (partial list)

References 

1971 births
Russian Wikimedians
Russian military historians
Russian encyclopedists
Living people
Gromov Flight Research Institute employees